Molakalmuru is a taluk in Chitradurga district in the Indian state of Karnataka. It is near the border of Karnataka and Andhra Pradesh. It borders the Rayadurg taluk of Ananthpur district of Andhra Pradesh. Legend has it that its name means "broken knees" in Kannada, referencing a battle between the native Indians and the British in which, due to the rocky and hilly terrain, British soldiers suffered many broken knees in their defeat. The town is famous for the unique Molkalmuru sarees manufactured here.

Demographics
As of the 2011 Indian census, Molakalmuru had a population of 15,797. Males constitute 50.35% of the population and females 49.65%. Molakalmuru has an average literacy rate of 71.44%, lower than the national average of 74.04%. Male literacy is 77.66%, and female literacy is 65.13%. 11.77% of the population is under 6 years of age.

Molakalmuru Silk Sarees

Molakalmuru silk sarees are the traditional sarees that are woven in the region. Molakalmuru sarees are also called Karnataka Kanchipuram. Recently they have been granted a Geographical Indication tag and its tag number is 53.

Important Places

Amakundi is a small village located in Molakalmuru Taluka, Chitradurga District, Karnataka, India. In this village, there is a panje makan and mazar mubarak of Masumvali Dada
 Ashoka Siddapura is an important archeological site where Emperor Ashoka's edicts were found. Nearby is Ramagiri, a hillock that has mythical associations with the epic Ramayana. A temple dedicated to Rameshwara built in 926 CE. exists here.
 Brahmagiri village is the ancient site of Ishila, one of emperor Ashoka's provincial capitals. His earliest rock edicts in Brahmi script and Prakrit language (3rd century BC) containing Kannada words were discovered.
 Devasamudra village is the ancient site of Devasamudra in the Ramayana. Ram had offered prayers to Shiva on a hill called Jatangi Rameshwara, which is located in Devasamudra Village, 3 kilometers from Rampura.
 Shirekola Village which has the Shree Guru Raghavendra Temple, located near Rampura.
 Jakkalavadike Village, near Siddapura, is named after old art works in the region. (Jakkalavadike means "house of world art" in Kannada). There are other facets to the village.
 The Nunkemale Siddeshwara Temple is a famous temple in the region and once in three years, a jaathre is held in the town. Another jaathre is held every year on the Nunkemalle hill for three days and people from the surrounding villages throng the fair.
 The Sri Rama Temple is another famous temple in this region. Every year, the Ramnavami festival is celebrated here with great pomp and splendour. It also has a large reservoir and a huge rock which is popularly known as kugo bande, or the rock that screams. Here, tourists can hear echoes of their voices. The sithaphala fruits (custard apples) that grow in these hillocks are immensely delicious.

References

Cities and towns in Chitradurga district